The Holz Family Farmstead included an  family farm in Eagan in the U.S. state of Minnesota. Ground was broken by the Holz family in the 1870s, and they raised livestock, crops, fruits, and vegetables until 1993. The property had originally been purchased by developers intending to build residences but, in 1995, the city of Eagan purchased the property for use as a living farm museum.

References

External links
 Holz Farm

1870 establishments in Minnesota
Buildings and structures in Dakota County, Minnesota
Farms on the National Register of Historic Places in Minnesota
National Register of Historic Places in Dakota County, Minnesota
Protected areas of Dakota County, Minnesota
Regional parks in Minnesota
Farm museums in Minnesota